Special Inspector, also known as Across the Border, is a 1938 Canadian/American international coproduction crime film directed by Leon Barsha. It stars Charles Quigley, Rita Hayworth and George McKay. This was Hayworth’s second Canadian film for Columbia Pictures shot in Victoria, B.C.

Plot
U.S. Customs Service special inspector Tom Evans works with the British Columbia Provincial Police on an assignment to capture a gang smuggling furs from Canada into the United States.

Cast
Charles Quigley as Tom Evans
Rita Hayworth as Patricia Lane
George McKay as Silver
 Edgar Edwards as Bill
 John Graham Spacey as David Foster
Eddie Laughton as Tim posing as David Foster
 Bob Rideout as Dapper

References

External links

1938 films
American crime drama films
1938 crime drama films
Films directed by Leon Barsha
American black-and-white films
Canadian crime drama films
Columbia Pictures films
1930s American films
1930s Canadian films